Aush jushpare (آش جوش پَره) is a type of aush (Iranian thick soup/stew), commonly cooked in Khorasan, Gonabad, Ferdous and Sabzevar  in Iran. It is similar to the Chinese jiaozi. Historian Bayhaqi (-1077) mentioned about Aush Jushpare in his book "Tarikh-i Bayhaqi".
Aush Jushpare is one of the oldest Aush, but since it takes a lot of time for preparation, it is not commonly eaten now.  It is rather a dish of hospitality, which people eat on the occasion of special gatherings or festivals.  Traditional guest house restaurant serves Aush Jushpare as local specialty. Aush Jushpare was registered as intangible heritage of Iran on 5 January 2021.

Ingredients
Aush is typically made with a variation of ingredients but may include; flat wheat noodles, turmeric, vegetables (broccoli, carrots, onion, celery, spinach, garlic, jalapeño), legumes (chickpeas, kidney beans), herbs (dill, mint, coriander, minced cilantro), yogurt and ground lamb, beef or chicken.

As a dish prepared at home, each family has its own preferred method of making them, using favorite fillings, with types and methods of preparation varying from city to city. usually in Gonabad people do not add meat to the aush bou some add the dumpling meat fillings include, mutton, beef, chicken, which are usually mixed with chopped Beans, peas and onions vegetables.some family add other Popular vegetable fillings like napa cabbage, scallion (spring onions), leek, celery, spinach, mushroom, edible black fungus, carrot, and garlic chives, but the main ingredients for jushpare are Beans, peas and onions.

How to cook aush jushpare

First,  knead flour with water to make a dough. Broaden small piece of the dough to make a thin leaf shape, and put chopped stir-fried onions, pre-cooked lentils and peas, spices,  Wrap it in the shape of triangle or quadrangle so that it does not open. This is called Jushpare (similar to samosa or dumplings or ravioli). Then put this Jushpare in boiling water, simmer it well, about 35 minutes, and it is ready to eat.  Before eating, add a little powdered cashk (dried fermented milk).

In recent days, pre-boiled Jushpare or Aush is available in stores. Also, some people fry Jushpare in oil.

Aush in Iranian cuisine
There are more than 50 types of thick soup (aush)or Aash in Iranian cooking, ash reshteh being one of the more popular types. Some other well known āsh include ash-e anar (pomegranate stew), ash-e-jo (barley stew), ash-e doogh, ash-e sak (spinach stew), ash-e torsh (beet/pickle stew). The Iranian variation of aush often is topped with a garnish (na’na dagh) of fried mint oil, garlic chips, and/or shallot chips.

Depending on the type of aush, it could contain different types of grain, legumes (chick peas, black-eye beans, lentils), vegetables, tomato, turnips (Aush-e-Shalqham), herbs (parsley, spinach, dill, spring onion ends, coriander, dried mint), onions, oil, meat, garlic, reshteh (in Ash Reshteh) and spices, such as salt, pepper, turmeric, saffron, etc.

Aush can be considered a full meal or a first course. Aush can often be bought in Persian stores canned, as dried mixes or frozen.

Since Aush is a very basic food in Iran, it became the etymology of words related to cooking. The word "cook" is "AushPaz" in Persian which is combination of "Aush" and "Paz", and literally means "a person who cooks Aush". Also the word "kitchen" is "AushPaz Khaneh": the combination of "AushPaz" and "Khaneh" which means house.

See also

 Ash-e anar
 Ash reshteh
 Kalehjoosh
 List of soups
 Afghan Cuisine
 Jiaozi 
 Armenian cuisine
 Azerbaijani cuisine
 Indian cuisine
 Iranian cuisine
 Iraqi cuisine
 Israeli cuisine
Kazakh cuisine
 Turkish cuisine
 Pakistani cuisine
Uzbek cuisine

Sources

External links 

Ancient dishes
Afghan cuisine
Armenian cuisine
Assyrian cuisine
Iranian cuisine
Syrian cuisine
Food watchlist articles
Indian cuisine
Types of food
Soups
Iranian soups
Azerbaijani soups